The Winston-Salem Mammoths were an American ice hockey team in Winston-Salem, North Carolina. They played in the Southern Hockey League for the 1995-96 season.  The Mammoths lost in the finals to the Huntsville Channel Cats in the only season of the Southern Hockey League. The team was coached by former Toronto Maple Leafs player John Anderson and Patrick Doyle was the team's general manager. The team was owned by Beaver Sports Properties.

Season-by-season record

Records
Games: Alain Côté, Hayden O'Rear, Bruno Villeneuve 60
Goals: Yvan Corbin 52
Assists: Alexei Dejev 51
Points: Yvan Corbin 95
PIM: Mike Degurse 302

External links
 The Internet Hockey Database

Ice hockey teams in North Carolina
Southern Hockey League (1995–96) teams
Ice hockey clubs established in 1995
Sports in Winston-Salem, North Carolina
Sports clubs disestablished in 1996
1995 establishments in North Carolina
1996 disestablishments in North Carolina
Defunct ice hockey teams in the United States